{{Infobox comics character 
|image= Ronald 'Ronnie' Raymond.png
|imagesize= 
|converted = y
|caption = Ronnie Raymond, as he appeared in Firestorm the Nuclear Man #3 (May 1978),art by Al Milgrom
|character_name = Firestorm
|real_name = Ronald "Ronnie" Raymond
|publisher=DC Comics
|debut = Firestorm #1 (March 1978)
|creators = Gerry Conway (writer)Al Milgrom  (artist)
|Base of operations = 
|species   = Metahuman
|homeworld = 
|alliances = Justice LeaguePower CompanyExtreme Justice
|partners  = 
|supports  = 
|aliases   =  
|powers = {{ulist|Ability to rearrange the atomic and molecular structure of matter
  |Can alter the density of objects, including his own body, and render them intangible
  |Can project bolts of nuclear energy
  |Flight</li>Absorb explosive force and radiation into his body harmlessly
  |Enhanced strength, endurance, and resilience
  |"Quark vision"
 }}
|cat = super
|subcat = DC Comics
|hero = y
|villain = 
|sortkey = Ronald Raymond
}}
Ronald "Ronnie" Raymond is a character appearing in comics published by DC Comics. He is one of several characters called Firestorm, normally fused together with Martin Stein or Jason Rusch. He first appeared in Firestorm the Nuclear Man #1 (March 1978), and was created by writer Gerry Conway and artist Al Milgrom.

Ronnie Raymond has made several appearances in DC-related media, such as The Flash, in which he is portrayed by Robbie Amell.

Publication history
The first Firestorm series was short-lived, canceled abruptly in a company-wide cutback (the "DC Implosion" ) with #5 (the first part of a multiple-issue story) the last to be distributed, and #6 included in Cancelled Comic Cavalcade. Writer Conway added Firestorm to the roster of Justice League of America. This led to a series of eight-page stories in the back of The Flash (with art by George Pérez), and a revival of a monthly Firestorm comic in 1982. The Fury of Firestorm (later called Firestorm the Nuclear Man) lasted from 1982 until 1990. A new Firestorm title starring both Ronnie and his successor, Jason Rusch, was launched in 2011. The series, The Fury of Firestorm: The Nuclear Men was written by Gail Simone and Ethan Van Sciver and drawn by Yildiray Cinar.

In Firestorm the Nuclear Man #1 (March 1978) Ronnie Raymond is named for the very first time when Martin Stein calls him "Ronald"; later, Raymond introduces himself to Doreen Day and Clifford Carmichael as Ronnie; afterwards, while Martin Stein refers to him only as Ronald, everyone else calls him Ronnie. In Who's Who in the DC Universe #8, his name is listed as Ronald (Ronnie) Raymond, originally Ronald Rockwell. The same pattern continues in Firestorm (vol. 2) until John Ostrander takes over with Fury of Firestorm #58 and continuing through to the series finale in issue #100, he has everyone refer to him as Ronald or Ron, except for family and friends. In Who's Who Update '88 #1, he is also listed as Ronald (Ronnie) Raymond. In Who's Who in the DC Universe #10, Martin Stein is listed as Firestorm and the entry refers to Ronald as "Ron Raymond". In Extreme Justice #4 and for several issues after that, he is the supermodel known as "Ron Ray". In Firestorm (vol. 3) #6 and in later issues, he is referred to as Ronnie Raymond. Most recently in the DC Comics Encyclopedia (2004), he was listed only as Ronnie Raymond.

Firestorm was featured in the CW's Arrowverse, portrayed by Robbie Amell, Victor Garber, and Franz Drameh.

Fictional character biography
The original Firestorm was distinguished by his integrated dual identity. High school student Ronnie Raymond and Nobel Prize-winning physicist Martin Stein were caught in an accident that allowed them to fuse into Firestorm the Nuclear Man. Due to Stein's being unconscious during the accident, Raymond was prominently in command of the Firestorm form with Stein a voice of reason inside his mind, able to offer Raymond advice on how to use their powers without actually having any control over their dual form. Banter between the two was a hallmark of their adventures. Stein was initially completely unaware of their dual identity, leaving him concerned about his unusual disappearances and blackouts, but Ronnie was eventually able to convince Stein of the truth, allowing them to bond as separate individuals rather than as parts of a whole.

After the accident, Firestorm took to defending New York City from such threats as Multiplex and Killer Frost. The 1982 series began with the teenaged Raymond adjusting to his newfound role and later delved into the issue of the nuclear arms race. The Fury of Firestorm slowly developed the lives of Raymond and Stein, as the teenager struggled with high school and moved towards graduation and the scientist found a life outside the lab after learning about his bond with Raymond. A second nuclear hero, Firehawk, was added as a love interest for Firestorm in 1984. In the same year, the character of Felicity Smoak was introduced, initially having a combative relationship with Raymond, but eventually becoming his stepmother following her marriage to his father Eddie Raymond. The series also tried to create a sense of fun, something that Gerry Conway felt was missing during his years writing Spider-Man; the banter between Raymond and Professor Stein contributed to this. Upon graduation from high school, Raymond entered college in Pittsburgh, where Stein had been hired as a professor. Afterward, together they searched for a cure for their bond.

When Conway left the series in 1986, John Ostrander (with artist Joe Brozowski) began writing the Firestorm stories. His first major story arc pitted Firestorm against the world as the hero, acting on a suggestion from the terminally ill Professor Stein, demanded that the United States and the Soviet Union destroy all of their nuclear weapons. After confrontations with the Justice League and most of his enemies, Firestorm faced the Russian nuclear superhero Pozhar in the Nevada desert, where an atomic bomb was dropped on them. A new Firestorm resulted, a fusion of the two heroes: this new Firestorm was composed of Raymond and the Russian Mikhail Arkadin, but controlled by the disembodied amnesiac mind of Stein.

The Firestorm form with Arkadin proved to be a transitional phase, as in 1989 Ostrander fundamentally changed the character of Firestorm by revealing that Firestorm was a "Fire Elemental". Firestorm now became something of an environmental crusader, formed from Raymond, Arkadin and Svarozhich, a Soviet clone of the previous Firestorm, but with a new mind. Professor Stein, no longer part of the composite at all, continued to play a role, but the focus was on this radically different character. New artist Tom Mandrake would create a new look to match. It was during this phase that Firestorm met and befriended Sango and the Orishas, the elemental gods of Nigeria. He also met their chief deity and Sango's older brother Obatala, Lord of the White Cloth.

By the series' 100th issue, Stein learned that he was destined to be the true Fire Elemental and would have been were it not for Raymond also being there by circumstance. Raymond and Arkadin were returned to their old lives, and Stein as Firestorm was accidentally exiled to deep space in the process of saving Earth. He thereafter spent many years traveling through space as a wanderer, returning to Earth only rarely.

After the transition to the elemental Firestorm, all of the main characters from the series vanished from the comics for some time after the cancellation of the Firestorm comic in 1990. Raymond eventually returned in the pages of Extreme Justice. Raymond, at the time undergoing treatment for leukemia, regained his original powers after a chemotherapy session. It took the combined might of the Justice League led by Captain Atom and the returned elemental Firestorm to restore Ronnie's health. Firestorm began to appear regularly in a number of DC titles, though lacking the guidance and knowledge necessary to use his skills wisely. Firestorm was drafted by Batman into a "replacement" Justice League that was commissioned in case something befell the original team (in this case, being stranded in the distant past in "The Obsidian Age" storyline). After the original team returned, Firestorm stayed on as a reserve member and participated in events such as a team-up with the Justice Society of America (in JLA/JSA: Virtue and Vice) and the intercompany crossover JLA/Avengers. He was also briefly a member of the Power Company.

Ronnie Raymond was killed during the Identity Crisis miniseries. During a battle with the Shadow Thief, Raymond was impaled by the Shining Knight's sword, which the Shadow Thief had stolen. The magical sword ruptured the nuclear man's containment field, resulting in Firestorm's body exploding and his residual essence funneling into the body of Jason Rusch, the new host of the Firestorm Matrix. His name was featured posthumously on Rip Hunter, Time Master's chalkboard in Booster Gold (vol. 2) #1 in the statement "Ronnie Raymond + X = Firestorm".

In the 2009–2010 Blackest Night miniseries, Ronnie Raymond is called by a black power ring to join the Black Lantern Corps. In the following issue, his reanimated corpse is shown confronting Barry Allen/The Flash and Hal Jordan/Green Lantern alongside Hawkman, Hawkgirl, the Elongated Man, Sue Dibny, and J'onn J'onzz. He then attacks Jason Rusch (the current Firestorm), and absorbs the latter into his own version of the Firestorm Matrix. Then, using Jason's unique abilities, he turns Gehenna into table salt, simultaneously ripping Gehenna's heart out with a smile. He uses the Firestorm Matrix to absorb Jason's anger over Gehenna's death, providing the Black Lanterns with even more emotional energies. He goes on to attack Barry and company at the Justice League satellite. Jason then briefly asserts himself, allowing the heroes to escape. Regaining control, Ronnie proceeds to absorb Jason's willpower. Like other Black Lanterns, the undead Firestorm mimics Ronnie's personality, often wisecracking and exhibiting other stereotypical teenage behavior. In the final battle against Nekron, Ronnie is restored to life alongside Jason, the two separating from Firestorm. Ronnie is confused, asking the Atom where Professor Stein is while Jason is upset with Ronnie killing Gehenna. Ronnie, however, apparently has no memory of doing so.

In the 2010–2011 Brightest Day miniseries, Ronnie Raymond, still clad in casual clothing from a wild party the night before, arrives at Jason Rusch's apartment with Professor Stein and Ray Palmer to attend Gehenna's funeral. Stein and Palmer discuss Ronnie's return and how he no longer remembers anything since his death by the Shadow Thief. While the two talk about the paperwork needed to have Ronnie's legal status as "dead" reversed, Ronnie approaches Jason and offers an apology about Gehenna's murder. Jason refuses to accept it, telling Ronnie that he forced Jason into being an accomplice to his own girlfriend's death, and that he probably doesn't even remember Gehenna's name. When Ronnie is actually unable to remember Gehenna's name, Jason angrily lashes out and punches him in the face. This causes the two young men to merge into Firestorm, and they begin arguing inside the Firestorm Matrix, while Palmer transforms into the Atom to help them separate.

Palmer manages to separate Jason and Ronnie, but not before the Firestorm matrix causes a huge explosion, trans-mutating everything in the Professor's laboratory into table salt. While recovering in the hospital, Stein explains to Ronnie that it seems to be very dangerous to fuse into Firestorm again. Also, it is revealed that Ronnie, after quickly leaving the hospital and being threatened by Jason's father to stay away from Jason, lied to everyone, as he seems to perfectly remember murdering Gehenna as a Black Lantern.

Some time after the forceful separation, he lies sleeping in preparation of a party, when a previously heard voice prods him awake – a monstrous construct of Gehenna, made totally of table salt, which proceeds to throttle and choke him, taunting him to remember her name; while she is interrupted before killing him, Ronnie is left covered in salt. Not too long after, he is lying, recovering from a massive binge, when Jason again forces the merge to help several construction workers endangered when the girders at the site are transmuted without warning into bubble gum. This time, they again hear the mysterious voice taunting them, and Ronnie accepts he remembers killing Gehenna, and they realize something else is lurking from within the Firestorm Matrix.

As Firestorm, Ronnie and Jason visit Stein in an attempt to find out what is happening to them. Stein reveals to them that the Black Lantern Firestorm still exists in the Firestorm Matrix. Firestorm is then told by the Entity that they must learn from each other and defeat the Black Lantern Firestorm before he destroys the Entity. Somehow, Jason and Ronnie trade places.

After running a test, Professor Stein reveals the origin of the Firestorm Matrix. Stein believes that during the initial experiment he was able to capture the spark that preceded the Big Bang that created the universe, thereby making the Matrix a trigger for a new Big Bang. If the boys continue to experience emotional imbalance, they increase the likelihood of triggering a new Big Bang. After explaining this to the boys, the voice inside them speaks again. Declaring that it is not the Firestorm Matrix, a pair of black hands reaches out from inside Firestorm. Forcibly separating Jason and Ronnie, Black Lantern Firestorm stands between them, separate from both Ronnie and Jason and apparently calling itself Deathstorm.

Deathstorm reveals its plan to Stein, stating that it intends to create enough emotional instability between Ronnie and Jason that the Matrix will trigger another Big Bang, thereby destroying all life in the universe. To help accomplish this goal, Deathstorm absorbs Stein's mind to use his knowledge of Ronnie against him; then, to torture Jason, Deathstorm brings his father Alvin Rusch to the lab and absorbs him as well. Taking flight, Deathstorm beckons Ronnie and Jason (now merged into Firestorm) to follow it. Deathstorm leads them to Silver City, New Mexico and the resting place of the Central Power White Lantern Battery. Deathstorm tries to lift the battery but is unable to until he infects it with black energy, after which he is able to lift it with ease. After he threatens to destroy the White Lantern Battery and therefore prevent Ronnie and Jason to truly live, a voice beckons him not to. The voice commands him to bring the Central Power White Lantern Battery to the voice as well as an army, at which point Deathstorm brings back the Black Lantern versions of Professor Zoom (the Reverse-Flash), Maxwell Lord, the Hawk, Jade, Captain Boomerang, the Martian Manhunter, Aquaman, Hawkman, Hawkgirl, Deadman and Osiris.

Deathstorm and the Black Lanterns teleport to an unknown location, Firestorm (Jason and Ronnie) ultimately seek the help from the Justice League. Firestorm arrive at the Hall of Justice asking for help. Firestorm is placed in a containment chamber while the League search for a way to stabilize the energy. However, an internal argument between Ronnie and Jason ignites the spark, apparently resulting in the destruction of the universe. Ronnie and Jason quickly notice, after defeating a hive of Shadow Demons, that the universe was not destroyed as they thought, but they were actually transported to the Anti-Matter Universe. There they are contacted by the Entity who reveals to them that, since Boston Brand has not yet found the one who will take the Entity's place, it is Firestorm mission to protect the Entity. Meanwhile, Deathstorm and the Black Lanterns are shown on Qward delivering the White Lantern Battery to someone. That someone is revealed to be the Anti-Monitor, seeking to harvest the life energy within the Lantern to grow stronger. Firestorm takes the White Lantern Battery and attempts to fight the Anti-Monitor, but is defeated. Deathstorm then brings Professor Stein out of his Matrix to taunt the two with. Deathstorm then attempts to turn Ronnie into table salt, but the Professor takes the brunt of the attack. Angered, Ronnie decides to truly work together with Jason to avenge the Professor. The Entity then declares that Ronnie has accomplished his mission, returning him to life in a burst of white energy that obliterates the Black Lanterns, returns Jason's father to his home, and deposits Firestorm in the Star City forest. Ronnie angrily attempts to make the Entity resurrect the Professor, but is refused. Deadman then arrives, demanding that he be given the White Lantern Battery.

When the "Dark Avatar" made his presence known, Firestorm is part of the Elementals. Ronnie was then transformed by the Entity to become the element of fire and protect the Star City Forest from the "Dark Avatar" which appears to be the Black Lantern version of the Swamp Thing. The Elementals are then fused with the body of Alec Holland for him to be transformed by the Entity into the new Swamp Thing and battle against the Dark Avatar. After the Dark Avatar is defeated, the Swamp Thing brought Firestorm back to normal. Afterward, Ronnie and Jason must find a way to contain their Firestorm Matrix from the explosion in less than 90 days.

After the events of the 2011 Flashpoint storyline, The New 52 reality altered Firestorm's personal history to the point of being completely restarted. Ronnie Raymond is now introduced as a high school senior and the captain of the football team. During a terrorist attack on their school, classmate Jason Rusch produces a vial given to him by Professor Stein, which contains the "God Particle", one of Stein's creations. The God Particle transforms both Jason and Ronnie into Firestorm, and the two teens briefly battle each other before accidentally merging into a hulking creature known as the Fury.

Sharing the identity of Firestorm, with Ronnie being the brawn and Jason being the brains, Firestorm is considered for recruitment into the Justice League along with several other heroes. They play a large part in the events leading up to the Trinity War, the three-way battle between the Justice League (the original team headed by Superman, Batman and Wonder Woman), the Justice League of America (the A.R.G.U.S.-sponsored team led by Steve Trevor, the Green Arrow and Amanda Waller), and Justice League Dark (the paranormal team consisting of John Constantine, Zatanna and the Phantom Stranger). When Superman is framed for the death of Dr. Light and the Justice League is taken into custody, Waller has Firestorm experiment on their ability to create certain elements: specifically, the mass production of kryptonite. It turns out that the two are indeed capable of using their powers to create it, but with some difficulty. However, this ultimately becomes moot once the Trinity War leads to the invasion of the Crime Syndicate, who supposedly kill the Justice League. In fact, the Justice League is trapped inside Firestorm by his Earth-3 counterpart Deathstorm (a combination of Martin Stein and an experimented corpse), with only Batman and Catwoman escaping the initial fracas. The Leagues are presumed dead for a time, but are eventually freed from captivity after the Crime Syndicate is defeated by Batman and Lex Luthor's Injustice League, Batman using Wonder Woman's Lasso of Truth to draw the latter and the others out of Firestorm.

Powers and abilities

Other versions
Ronnie Raymond has appeared in various alternate realities within the DC Multiverse:  a version of the Ronnie Raymond Firestorm appeared in JLA: The Nail, as a captive of Cadmus Labs; a Firestork of the Just'a Lotta Animals; and a merger of Ronnie Raymond and Nathaniel Adam of Earth-37 called Quantum-Storm, who was summoned by Monarch in the miniseries Countdown: Arena.

Flashpoint
In the alternative timeline of Flashpoint, Jason Rusch is killed by Heat Wave in an attempt to take his place in the Firestorm Matrix, alongside Ronnie Raymond, but is defeated by Cyborg.

In other media

Television

 Ronnie Raymond appears in Super Friends: The Legendary Super Powers Show, voiced by Mark L. Taylor.
 Ronnie Raymond appears in The Super Powers Team: Galactic Guardians, voiced again by Mark L. Taylor.
 Ronnie Raymond was planned to appear in Justice League Unlimited, with writer/producer Dwayne McDuffie stating that the producers had permission from DC Comics to use the character. However, the show's creators could not come up with a story that they liked.
 Ronnie Raymond appears in Batman: The Brave and the Bold, voiced by Bill Fagerbakke. This version is a high school coach who was fused with high school student Jason Rusch and became Firestorm after being exposed to Doctor Double X's supercharged nuclear energy. Producer James Tucker said, "...the smart kid has the body and he's got this dumb guy in his head telling him stuff...it's kind of a total flip of the original Firestorm".
 Ronnie Raymond appears in the first season of The Flash, portrayed by Robbie Amell. This version is Caitlin Snow's fiancé and an engineer at S.T.A.R. Labs who was exposed to dark matter energy amidst the explosion of Harrison Wells's particle accelerator and presumed dead, but was actually fused with Martin Stein and the F.I.R.E.S.T.O.R.M. matrix. After Team Flash separate the two, Raymond and Stein master their powers and assist the Flash in fighting crime. Raymond would go on to marry Snow, but he later sacrifices himself to close a singularity that had opened over Central City due to the Reverse-Flash.
 Ronnie Raymond appears in Justice League Action, voiced by P. J. Byrne.

Video games
Ronnie Raymond appears as a playable character in Lego Batman 3: Beyond Gotham, voiced by Nolan North.

References

External links
Firestorm at Don Markstein's Toonopedia. Archived from the original on July 29, 2016.
 
 

1978 comics debuts
Fictional Russian people
Russian superheroes
DC Comics American superheroes
Characters created by Al Milgrom
Characters created by Gerry Conway
Comics characters introduced in 1978
Comics by John Ostrander
DC Comics characters who can move at superhuman speeds
 DC Comics characters with superhuman senses
DC Comics characters with superhuman strength
DC Comics metahumans
DC Comics superheroes
DC Comics television characters
DC Comics titles
Fictional characters who can turn intangible
Fictional characters with absorption or parasitic abilities
Fictional characters with density control abilities
Fictional characters with elemental transmutation abilities
Fictional characters with fire or heat abilities
Fictional characters with nuclear or radiation abilities 
Fictional characters with energy-manipulation abilities
Fictional characters with X-ray vision
DC Comics male superheroes
Characters created by John Ostrander
Merged fictional characters